The Poetry Society of America is a literary organization founded in 1910 by poets, editors, and artists. It is the oldest poetry organization in the United States. Past members of the society have included such renowned poets as Witter Bynner, Robert Frost, Langston Hughes, Edna St. Vincent Millay, Marianne Moore, and Wallace Stevens.

History
In 1910, the Poetry Society of America held its first official meeting in the National Arts Club in Manhattan, which is still home to the organization today. Jessie Belle Rittenhouse, a founding member and Secretary of the PSA, documented the founding of the Poetry Society of America in her autobiography My House of Life writing "It was not, however, to be an organization in the formal sense of the word, but founded upon the salon idea, a place where poets would gather to read and discuss their work and that of their contemporaries, the group to be united largely through the hospitality of our hosts at whose apartments it was proposed we should continue to meet...When, after much enthusiastic speech-making, a committee was appointed to retire and discuss the details, I had no hesitancy in saying—though at the risk of seeming ungrateful to our hosts—that it was much too big an idea to be narrowed down to a social function, into which it would inevitably deteriorate, and if the Society were developed at all, it ought to be along national lines, and should meet in a public rather than a private place."

Within the first few years, poets such as Amy Lowell, Ezra Pound and W.B. Yeats regularly attended meetings.

Poetry In Motion
In 1992 the Poetry Society launched Poetry in Motion along with  the New York City MTA in the New York City subway system, a program which has since placed poetry in the transit systems of over 20 cities throughout the country such as: Atlanta, Boston, Chicago, Los Angeles, New Orleans, Portland, and Salt Lake City. The program has been honored with numerous awards including a Design for Transportation Merit Award, the New York Municipal Society's Certificate of Merit, and in 2000 a proclamation from the Council of the City of New York that honored the program for its "invaluable contribution to the people of New York City."

Pulitzer Prize
The Poetry Society was instrumental in the establishment of a Pulitzer Prize for Poetry. In 1917, after the first Pulitzer prizes were awarded, Society member Edward J. Wheeler petitioned the President of Columbia University to include poetry as an award category. After receiving a reply from the President that there had been no funds allocated to award a prize in poetry, Wheeler secured $500 on behalf of the Society from a New York City art patron in order to establish the prize.  The Poetry Society continued to provide this support until 1922 when Columbia University as well as the Pulitzer Board, voted to regularize a Pulitzer Prize in Poetry.

Awards
In 1915 the Society began conferring awards honoring innovation and mastery of the form by emerging and established American poets.

Frost Medal — for distinguished lifetime achievement in American poetry. Inaugurated 1930; awarded annually since 1984. The medal was first presented in 1930 to Jessie Belle Rittenhouse, and to the memory of Bliss Carman and George Edward Woodberry. Over the next 53 years, the Frost Medal was awarded eleven times, to poets at the end of their careers. In 1984, it became an annual award to a living poet.  Since 1995, the recipient of the Frost Medal has delivered the Frost Medal Lecture. Medalists receive a prize purse of $5,000. Robert Frost was the fourth recipient of the Frost Medal, in 1941, after he retired from Amherst College.
Shelley Memorial Award — offered by the society to a poet living in the United States who is chosen on the basis of "genius and need." Awarded annually since 1930, with the exception of 1933.
Four Quartets Prize – for a unified and complete sequence of poems published in America in a print or online journal, chapbook, or book; presented in partnership with the T.S. Eliot Foundation. Awarded annually since 2018.

Chapbook fellowships
Beginning in 2003, the Society began sponsoring an annual chapbook contest, awarding four fellowships to poets who have not yet published a full-length poetry collection. These fellowships include:

The National Chapbook Fellowship — given to two US poets who have yet to publish a first book of poems. 
The New York Chapbook Fellowship — given to two New York poets under 30 years of age who have yet to publish a first book of poems

Annual awards
In addition to the Frost Medal, Shelley Award, and Four Quartets Prize, the Poetry Society confers other awards:

Writer Magazine/Emily Dickinson Award — awarded for a poem inspired by Emily Dickinson.
Cecil Hemley Memorial Award  — awarded for a lyric poem that addresses a philosophical or epistemological concern.
Lyric Poetry Award  — awarded for a lyric poem on any subject.
Lucille Medwick Memorial Award  — awarded for an original poem in any form on a humanitarian theme.
Louise Louis/Emily F. Bourne Student Poetry Award  — awarded for the best unpublished poem by a student in grades 9 through 12 from the United States.
George Bogin Memorial Award  — awarded for a selection of four or five poems that use language in an original way to reflect the encounter of the ordinary and the extraordinary and to take a stand against oppression in any of its forms.
Robert H. Winner Memorial Award  — awarded to original work being done in mid-career by a poet who has not had substantial recognition.
Louis Hammer Memorial Award  — awarded for a distinguished poem in the surrealist manner.
Norma Farber First Book Award — for a first book of original poetry written by an American and published in either a hard or soft cover in a standard edition.
William Carlos Williams Award — offered by the society for the best book of poetry published by a small, non-profit, or university press.

References

External links
 

American poetry
Poetry organizations
American writers' organizations
Culture of New York City
Arts organizations based in New York City
Organizations based in Manhattan
Arts organizations established in 1910
1910 establishments in the United States